The Man Who Fell to Earth is a 1976 British science fantasy drama film directed by Nicolas Roeg and adapted by Paul Mayersberg. Based on Walter Tevis's 1963 novel of the same name, the film follows an extraterrestrial (Thomas Jerome Newton) who crash lands on Earth seeking a way to ship water to his planet, which is suffering from a severe drought, but finds himself at the mercy of human vices and corruption. It stars David Bowie, Candy Clark, Buck Henry, and Rip Torn. It was produced by Michael Deeley and Barry Spikings. The same novel was later adapted as a television film in 1987. A 2022 television series with the same name serves as a continuation of the film 45 years later, including featuring Newton as a character and showing archival footage from the film.

The Man Who Fell to Earth retains a cult following for its use of surreal imagery and Bowie's first starring film role as the alien Thomas Jerome Newton. It is considered an important work of science fiction cinema and one of the best films of Roeg's career.

Plot 
Thomas Jerome Newton is a humanoid alien who travels to Earth from a distant planet. Landing in New Mexico, he appears as an Englishman. Newton has arrived on Earth on a mission to take water back to his home planet, which is experiencing a catastrophic drought. Newton swiftly uses the advanced technology of his home planet to patent many inventions on Earth. He acquires tremendous wealth as the head of an Arizona technology-based conglomerate, World Enterprises Corporation, aided by leading patent attorney Oliver Farnsworth. This wealth is needed to construct a space vehicle with the intention of shipping water back to his home planet.

While revisiting New Mexico, Newton meets Mary-Lou, a lonely young woman from Oklahoma who works an array of part-time jobs in a small town hotel to support herself. Mary-Lou introduces Newton to many customs of Earth, including churchgoing, alcohol, and sex. She and Newton move into a house together which he has built close to where he first landed in New Mexico.

Dr. Nathan Bryce, a former college professor who slept with his students, has landed a job as a fuel technician with World Enterprises and slowly becomes Newton's confidant. Bryce senses Newton's alienness and arranges a meeting with Newton at his home where he has hidden a special X-ray camera. When he takes a picture of Newton with the camera, it reveals Newton's alien physiology. Newton's appetite for alcohol and television (he is capable of watching multiple televisions at once) becomes crippling, and he and Mary-Lou fight. Realizing that Bryce has learnt his secret, Newton reveals his alien form to Mary-Lou. She struggles to accept his true form. She flees in panic and horror.

Newton completes the spaceship and attempts to take it on its maiden voyage amid intense press exposure. However, just before his scheduled take-off, he is seized and detained, apparently by the government and a rival company. His business partner Farnsworth is murdered. The government, which had been monitoring Newton via his driver, holds Newton captive in a locked luxury apartment, constructed deep within a hotel. During his captivity, they keep him sedated with alcohol (to which he has become addicted) and continuously subject him to rigorous medical tests, cutting into his human disguise. One examination, involving X-rays, causes the contact lenses he wears as part of his human disguise to permanently affix themselves to his eyes.

Toward the end of Newton's years of captivity, he is visited again by Mary-Lou. She is much older, and her appearance has been ravaged by alcohol and time. They have mock-violent, playful sex that involves firing a gun with blanks, and afterwards occupy their time drinking and playing table tennis. Mary-Lou declares that she no longer loves him, and he replies that he does not love her either. Eventually Newton discovers that his "prison", now derelict, is unlocked, and he leaves.

Unable to return home, a despondent and alcoholic Newton creates a recording with alien messages, which he hopes will be broadcast via radio to his home planet. Bryce, who has since married Mary-Lou, buys a copy of the album and meets Newton at a restaurant. Newton is still rich and young-looking despite the passage of many years. However, he has also fallen into depression and continues to suffer from alcoholism. Seated on the restaurant's outdoor patio, Newton inquires about Mary-Lou, before collapsing in a drunken stupor on the chair.

Cast

Production 
Paramount Pictures had distributed Roeg's previous film, Don't Look Now (1973), and agreed to pay $1.5 million for the US rights. Michael Deeley used this guarantee to raise finance to make the film. Roeg originally considered casting author Michael Crichton and actor Peter O'Toole in the role of Newton before Bowie.

Filming

Filming began on 6 July 1975. The film was primarily shot in New Mexico, with filming locations in Albuquerque, White Sands, Artesia and Fenton Lake. The film's production had been scheduled to last eleven weeks, and throughout that time, the film crew ran into a variety of obstacles: Bowie was sidelined for a few days after drinking bad milk; film cameras jammed up; and for one scene shot in the desert, the movie crew had to contend with a group of Hells Angels who were camping nearby.

Bowie, who was using cocaine during the movie's production, was in a fragile state of mind when filming was underway, going so far as to state in 1983 that "I'm so pleased I made that [film], but I didn't really know what was being made at all" and that "My one snapshot memory of that film is not having to act. Just being me was perfectly adequate for the role. I wasn't of this earth at that particular time." He said of his performance:

Candy Clark, Bowie's co-star, remembers things differently: "David vowed to Nic, 'No drug use'," says Clark and he was a man of his word, "clear as a bell, focused, friendly and professional and leading the team. You can see it clearly because of (DP) Tony Richmond's brilliant cinematography. Look at David: his skin is luminescent. He's gorgeous, angelic, heavenly. He was absolutely perfect as the man from another planet." She added that Roeg had hired "an entirely British crew with him to New Mexico and I remember David was very happy about that." Roeg also cast Bowie's bodyguard, Tony Mascia, as his character's onscreen chauffeur.

Bowie and Roeg had a good relationship on set. Bowie recalled in 1992 that "we got on rather well. I think I was fulfilling what he needed from me for that role. I wasn't disrupting ... I wasn't disrupted. In fact, I was very eager to please. And amazingly enough, I was able to carry out everything I was asked to do. I was quite willing to stay up as long as anybody."

Bowie brought a personal library with him; "I took 400 books down to that film shoot. I was dead scared of leaving them in New York because I was knocking around with some pretty dodgy people and I didn't want any of them nicking my books. Too many dealers, running in and out of my place."

Music

Although Bowie was originally approached to provide the music, contractual wrangles during production caused him to withdraw from this aspect of the project. Nonetheless, Bowie would go on to use stills from the film for the covers of two of his albums, Station to Station (1976) and Low (1977). The music used in the film was coordinated by John Phillips, former leader of the pop group The Mamas & the Papas, with personal contributions from Phillips and Japanese percussionist-composer Stomu Yamash'ta as well as some stock music. Phillips called in former Rolling Stones guitarist Mick Taylor to assist with developing ideas for the soundtrack. The music was recorded at CTS Lansdowne Recording Studios in London, England.

Due to a creative and contractual dispute between Roeg and the studio, no official soundtrack was released for the film, even though the 1976 Pan Books paperback edition of the novel (released to tie in with the film) states on the back cover that the soundtrack is available on RCA Records. The soundtrack, derived from recently rediscovered masters, was eventually released on CD and LP in 2016 to coincide with the 40th anniversary of the film's premiere. The music by Yamash'ta had already  appeared on his own albums, as noted below.

Music crew
 Musical Directors: John Phillips, Derek Wadsworth
 Piano/Keyboards: Pete Kelly, John Taylor
 Guitars: Mick Taylor, Ricky Hitchcock, Richard Morcombe, Jim Sullivan
 Pedal Steel Guitar: B. J. Cole
 Bass: Steve Cook
 Drums: Henry Spinetti
 Percussion: Frank Ricotti

Music as listed on end credits

Composed and recorded by Stomu Yamashta:
 "Poker Dice" (from Floating Music)
 "33⅓" (from Raindog)
 "Mandala" (from the Soundtrack from Man from the East)
 "Wind Words" (from Freedom is Frightening)
 "One Way" (from Floating Music)
 "Memory of Hiroshima" (from the Soundtrack from Man from the East)

Performed by John Phillips:
 "Boys from the South"
 "Rhumba Boogie"
 "Bluegrass Breakdown"
 "Hello Mary-Lou" (featuring Mick Taylor)

Other music:
 "Blueberry Hill" – Louis Armstrong
 "Enfantillages Pittoresques" composed by Erik Satie, performed by Frank Glazer
 "A Fool Such As I" – Hank Snow
 "Make the World Go Away" – Jim Reeves
 "Try to Remember" – The Kingston Trio
 "Blue Bayou" – Roy Orbison
 "Silent Night" – Robert Farnon
 "True Love" – Bing Crosby
 "Love Is Coming Back" – Genevieve Waite
 "Stardust" – Artie Shaw
 "Planets Suite, Op. 32: Mars, Bringer of War & Venus, Bringer of Peace"composed by Gustav Holst and performed by the Bournemouth Symphony Orchestra

For the scenes in which Newton's thoughts drift back to his alien home, Phillips and Roeg enlisted Desmond Briscoe to craft simple electronic atmospheres that were then combined with whale songs, to eerie effect.

Release 
According to Michael Deeley, when Barry Diller of Paramount saw the finished film he refused to pay for it, claiming it was different from the film the studio wanted. British Lion sued Paramount and received a small settlement. The film obtained a small release in the United States through Cinema V in exchange for $850,000 and due to foreign sales the film's budget was just recouped.

The British Board of Film Censors passed the film uncut for adult UK audiences with an X rating.

It was announced in the summer of 2016 that the film was in the process of being digitally remastered to 4K quality for its 40th anniversary (which was reported to have begun before Bowie's death). This remastered version premiered at BFI Southbank before being released in cinemas across the UK on 9 September of that year. The film's 2011 and 2016 re-releases grossed $100,072 domestically and $73,148 internationally.

Reception

Critical response 

Roger Ebert of the Chicago Sun-Times awarded the film  stars of four; while he complimented parts of the film and the directing, he was dismissive of the plot, writing in his review that the film is "so preposterous and posturing, so filled with gaps of logic and continuity, that if it weren't so solemn there'd be the temptation to laugh aloud." Gene Siskel of the Chicago Tribune gave the film three stars out of four and wrote that it "may leave you punch drunk, knocked out by its visuals to the point of missing what a simple story it is." Richard Eder of The New York Times praised the film, writing, "There are quite a few science-fiction movies scheduled to come out in the next year or so. We shall be lucky if even one or two are as absorbing and as beautiful as The Man Who Fell to Earth."

Robert Hawkins, reviewing for Variety, praised Roeg's direction and felt the film was "stunning stuff throughout, and Bowie's choice as the ethereal visitor is inspired...Candy Clark, as his naive but loving mate, confirms the winning ways that won her an Oscar nomination in American Graffiti. Her intimate scenes with Bowie, especially the introductory ones, are among pic's highlights." Charles Champlin of the Los Angeles Times described Bowie as "perfect casting" but thought the film was "a muddle," and suspected it was because he reviewed a version trimmed by 20 minutes for its U.S. run: "That would do a lot to explain why the movie proceeds from the provocatively cryptic to the merely incomprehensible." In a retrospective review, Kim Newman of Empire gave the movie five stars out of five, describing the film as "consistently disorientating and beguilingly beautiful."

Review aggregator Rotten Tomatoes reports the film has an 82% approval rating based on 66 reviews with an average rating of 7.7/10. The critics' consensus states: "Filled with stunning imagery, The Man Who Fell to Earth is a calm, meditative film that profoundly explores our culture's values and desires." On Metacritic, the film has achieved a weighted average rating of 81 out of 100 from 9 critic reviews, citing "universal acclaim".

Legacy 
Since its original 1976 release, The Man Who Fell to Earth has achieved cult status. This status has been echoed by critics, especially as it was a popular hit with midnight movie audiences years after it was released. Joshua Rothkopf of Time Out believed that the cult classic status, which he described as a "vaguely demeaning term", does the film a disservice. He labeled the film as "the most intellectually provocative genre film of the 1970s." When re-released in 2011, Ebert gave the film three stars, stating that readers should "consider this just a quiet protest vote against the way projects this ambitious are no longer possible in the mainstream movie industry." The movie has been applauded for its experimental approach and compared to more recent sci-fi films such as Under the Skin. Rolling Stone ranked it second on its 50 best sci-fi movies of the 1970s, Timeout ranked it 35th on its 100 best sci-fi movies, it is 61st on the Online Film Critics Society list of "greatest science fiction films of all time". Empire placed it 42nd on its list of 100 best British films. British Film Institute included it on its list of "50 late night classics", demonstrating its popularity as a midnight movie.

Bowie's role in the film led to his casting as Nikola Tesla in The Prestige, with director Christopher Nolan stating "Tesla was this other-worldly, ahead-of-his-time figure, and at some point it occurred to me he was the original Man Who Fell to Earth. As someone who was the biggest Bowie fan in the world, once I made that connection, he seemed to be the only actor capable of playing the part."

Accolades

In popular culture 
 In Philip K. Dick's science fiction novel VALIS, fictionalised versions of Dick and K. W. Jeter become obsessed with Valis, a film starring musician Eric Lampton. Dick based the novel's story on his and Jeter's real obsession with The Man Who Fell to Earth; Lampton is a fictionalised stand-in for Bowie.
 The music video to Guns N' Roses's 1987 "Welcome to the Jungle" was partially based on The Man Who Fell to Earth.
 The music video to Scott Weiland's 1998 song "Barbarella" uses themes from The Man Who Fell to Earth.
 Dr. Manhattan's apartment and Ozymandias' Antarctic retreat in the 2009 film Watchmen were mainly based on the set of The Man Who Fell to Earth.
 The 2009 song "ATX" by Alberta Cross is based on Bowie's character in The Man Who Fell to Earth.
 Michael Fassbender has said he used Bowie's performance as an inspiration for the android David in Ridley Scott's 2012 science fiction film Prometheus.
 In Bret Easton Ellis's 2010 novel Imperial Bedrooms, the main character mentions that he is involved with writing the script for a remake of The Man Who Fell to Earth.
 The musical Lazarus, which premiered off-Broadway in 2015, with music and lyrics by David Bowie and book by Enda Walsh, is based on the novel and the film. While the music video for the 2013 Bowie song "The Stars (Are Out Tonight)" references the film with a picture of alien Bowie, as he appears in the film, on a magazine.
 The title of the Doctor Who episode "The Woman Who Fell to Earth" is a reference to the book and film.

References

External links 
 
 
 
 
 
 
The Man Who Fell to Earth: Loving the Alien an essay by Graham Fuller at the Criterion Collection
 Brows Held High's take on the 1976 classic

1976 films
1976 drama films
1970s avant-garde and experimental films
1970s dystopian films
1970s English-language films
1970s science fiction drama films
British avant-garde and experimental films
British Lion Films films
British science fiction drama films
Films about extraterrestrial life
Films based on American novels
Films based on science fiction novels
Films directed by Nicolas Roeg
Films set in New Mexico
Films set in New York (state)
Films shot in New Mexico
Films with screenplays by Paul Mayersberg
Murder in films
1970s British films